Events in the year 1953 in Brazil.

Incumbents

Federal government
 President: Getúlio Vargas
 Vice President: Café Filho

Governors 
 Alagoas: Arnon de Mello
 Amazonas: Álvaro Botelho Maia
 Bahia: Régis Pacheco 
 Ceará: Raul Barbosa
 Espírito Santo: Francisco Alves Ataíde
 Goiás: Pedro Ludovico Teixeira 
 Mato Grosso: Fernando Corrêa da Costa
 Minas Gerais: Juscelino Kubitschek 
 Pará: Zacarias de Assumpção 
 Paraíba: José Américo de Almeida 
 Paraná: Bento Munhoz da Rocha Neto
 Pernambuco: Etelvino Lins de Albuquerque 
 Piauí: Pedro Freitas 
 Rio de Janeiro: Amaral Peixoto                                                      
 Rio Grande do Norte: Silvio Piza Pedrosa 
 Rio Grande do Sul: Ildo Meneghetti 
 Santa Catarina: Irineu Bornhausen 
 São Paulo: Lucas Nogueira Garcez 
 Sergipe: Arnaldo Rollemberg Garcez

Vice governors
 Alagoas: Antônio Guedes de Miranda 
 Ceará: Stênio Gomes da Silva 
 Espírito Santo: Francisco Alves Ataíde
 Goiás: Jonas Ferreira Alves Duarte 
 Maranhão: Renato Bayma Archer da Silva
 Mato Grosso: João Leite de Barros 
 Minas Gerais: Clóvis Salgado da Gama 
 Paraíba: João Fernandes de Lima 
 Piauí: Tertuliano Milton Brandão 
 Rio de Janeiro: Tarcísio Miranda 
 Rio Grande do Norte: vacant 
 São Paulo: Erlindo Salzano 
 Sergipe: Edelzio Vieira de Melo

Events 
January 20 - Lima Barreto's film O Cangaceiro is released in cinemas.
April 1 - The Brazilian football team is defeated 3-2 by Paraguay at the Estadio Nacional, Lima, to finish second in the 1953 South American Championship.
June 30 - The naval destroyer escort USS Pennewill (DE-175) is transferred from the United States to Brazilian ownership, taking on the new name Bertioga (BE–1).
Date Unknown – JBS Group, meat processing brand on worldwide, was founded in Goiás.

Births
March 3 - Zico, footballer and coach
April 22 - Lucinha Turnbull, singer, composer and guitarist
May 4 - Lulu Santos, singer and guitarist
May 23 - Armandinho, composer and singer

Deaths 
March 20 - Graciliano Ramos, writer, 60
November 15 - Jorge de Lima, writer, 60

References

See also 
1953 in Brazilian football

 
1950s in Brazil
Years of the 20th century in Brazil
Brazil
Brazil